Sir Francis Mowatt  (28 April 1837 – 20 November 1919) was a British civil servant.
He was a radical and Liberal civil servant at the Head of the Treasury. His influence was felt at a time of expansion in governmental activities.

Personal life 
Mowatt was born in Sydney, Australia on 28 April 1837. His father Francis Mowatt (1803–1891) was an MP from Falmouth. His wife Sarah Sophia was the daughter of Captain George Barnes of Romford.  Barnes was part of the marine services of the British East India Company.  Mowatt's sister was married to Vernon Lushington, a permanent secretary to the Admiralty.

Early career 
Mowat was educated at Harrow (1851–53) and Winchester, before going on to St John's College, Oxford (1855–56). He was a Treasury Clerkship scholar. In one of the first civil service exams taken, he scored 880 marks out of 1545.  As a third class clerk he was paid £100 with an appraisal of £250.

On 9 June 1864, aged 27, Mowatt, on a salary of £430, married Lucy Sophia, daughter of John Andrew Freriche of Thirlestaine Hall, Cheltenham, and a widow of Count Stenbock, of Kolk, Estonia.

Civil Service 
At his previous work, he controlled expenditure at the Treasury.  He was promoted as a Second clerk (1860), and First class (1870) in Assistant Secretary division with a £700 to £900 salary.  He was made Principal clerk of the Law division in 1881, and awarded a Companion of the Bath (1884). He rose to deputy head of department in July 1889 and Assistant Secretary and Auditor of the civil list, on a yearly salary of £1500.  He was made a Knight Commander of the Bath (KCB) in 1893.  Mowatt became Permanent Secretary to the Treasury in 1895. Haldane required Mowatt and John Morley to join him on his trip to Ireland in 1898 to sort out the Catholic universities. Haldane later praised the "far-sighted Permanent head of Treasury in founding the Imperial College of Science and Technology..." Mowatt was appointed the first Chairman of Imperial before it was reconstructed, but retired due to ill-health.

Sir Francis was created a GCB in 1901. He stayed on in the civil service until 1903, sharing with Sir Edward Hamilton, as Joint Permanent Administrative Secretary; while Hamilton was joint secretary in charge of finance.

A crisis hit the Conservatives in 1902-3 when Joseph Chamberlain decided to split the cabinet by proposing the Tariff Reform League, giving preferential trading terms to the colonies, particularly in Canadian North America.  As Permanent Secretary, Mowatt was supposed to remain neutral and impartial, but Mowatt was an even more passionate Gladstonian free trade liberal than his predecessor, Sir F. Welby.  In August 1903, Mowatt wrote to Haldane that the Duke of Devonshire was prepared to set up a new ministry of Unionists with Haldane in the Foreign Office to defend Free Trade.

The Chancellor of the Exchequer, Charles Thomson Ritchie wanted to repeal the Corn Duty that had been imposed for the first time since 1846 by his predecessor Michael Hicks Beach.  Mowatt interfered on Ritchie's behalf, compromising his position.  Mowatt was photographed on the streets in London remonstrating toe to toe with Chamberlain. He trained Winston Churchill at the Board of Trade to be a free trader stimulating a defection to the Liberal party in 1904. Arthur Balfour was unimpressed with Mowatt's policy-making and bias.

On retirement Mowatt became an Alderman of the London County Council. He served on Royal Commissions and Official Committees. As a pastime he followed the South Downs Hunt at Parham. He was living at 41 Sloane Gardens, Chelsea, SW when he died on 20 November 1919.

References

Bibliography

1837 births
1919 deaths
British civil servants
Alumni of St John's College, Cambridge
People educated at Harrow School
People educated at Winchester College
People from Sydney
Knights Grand Cross of the Order of the Bath
Members of London County Council
Members of the Privy Council of the United Kingdom